Callithrinca is a genus of moths of the family Yponomeutidae.

Species
Callithrinca angoonae - Moriuti, 1982  (from Thailand)
Callithrinca evocatella - (Walker, 1863)  (from Borneo)
Callithrinca niphopyrrha - Meyrick, 1927  (from Fiji)
Callithrinca sphendonista - Meyrick, 1927  (from Samoa)

References

Yponomeutidae
Moth genera